The 1886 Texas gubernatorial election was held to elect the Governor of Texas. Lawrence Sullivan Ross was elected in a landslide over opposition from the Republican and Prohibition parties.

General election

Candidates
Lawrence Sullivan Ross, State Senator  and former Sheriff from McLennan County (Democratic)
Archelaus M. Cochran, internal revenue collector and former postmaster of Dallas
Ebenezer Lafayette Dohoney, former judge and State Senator from Lamar County (Prohibition)

Results

References

1886
Texas
1886 Texas elections